The Lilac Bloomsday Run, also known as Bloomsday, is an annual timed road race in the northwest United States, held on the first Sunday of May since 1977 in  The course length is 12 km (7.456 mi).

The run has had over 38,000 participants every year since 1986, and peaked  in 1996 with 61,298  The number of finishers in 2015 was 43,206. Lineth Chepkurui set an unofficial 12 km world record in the 2010 women's race.

Don Kardong, who founded the race, explained the name as "a starting event for the Lilac Festival … you know, lilacs blooming. And of course, I like it because it rhymes with doomsday." The shortened name Bloomsday is usually associated instead with James Joyce's 1922 novel Ulysses and celebrations of June 16, the day in the life of Leopold Bloom that the novel chronicles.

Kardong had hoped for five hundred participants for the inaugural edition in 1977, and got nearly triple that. The second edition had over five thousand, and the third in 1979 was over ten thousand, with fifty thousand spectators lining the streets. The sixth edition in 1982 had over 22,000,  and despite rain and some snow, there were over 30,000 in 1984.

A new course was introduced

Course
The course starts in Downtown Spokane and heads northwest along the far west end of town, passes by Mukogowa Ft. Wright Institute and Spokane Falls Community College before heading up "Doomsday Hill" and back downtown past the Spokane County Courthouse and ending at the Monroe Street Bridge. Every finisher of the race receives a Bloomsday T-shirt.

Results

Key: 

Notes

References

External links
 

Culture of Spokane, Washington
Long-distance running competitions
Sports in Spokane, Washington
Recurring sporting events established in 1977
Tourist attractions in Spokane County, Washington
Road running competitions in the United States